Juan Giraldo can refer to:

 Juan Giraldo (footballer) (born 1998), Colombian footballer
 Juan Giraldo (wrestler) (born 1974), Colombian Olympic wrestler